Global Peace Exchange (GPE) is a program based at Florida State University that coordinates student based exchanges for volunteering and developmental endeavors in countries around the world. The non-profit organization was founded in July 2007 by the co-founders/directors Nick Fiore, Maria Kuecken and Alex Merkovic. It is housed in the Claude Pepper Center for Intercultural Dialogue in Tallahassee, Florida.

References

External links
 Global Peace Exchange homepage
 Article on Dialogue Initiative and Rwandan President's Visit to Florida State
 Florida State University's Claude Pepper Center for Intercultural Dialogue
 Global Peace Exchange at Birmingham-Southern College homepage
 Nepal Earthquake Relief Efforts

Florida State University